António José Nogueira dos Santos (born 21 September 1963), known as Nogueira, is a Portuguese retired footballer who played mainly as a defender.

Football career
Nogueira was born in Lisbon. During his professional career, which he began already in his 20s, he represented Clube Oriental de Lisboa, SG Sacavenense, Académico de Viseu FC (his first Primeira Liga experience, aged 25), AD Fafe, F.C. Penafiel, Boavista FC (his most solid period, inclusively playing in the UEFA Cup) and Vitória de Setúbal.

Nogueira retired at nearly 34, amassing Portuguese top division totals of 209 games and eight goals over the course of seven seasons. He earned seven caps for Portugal – his debut coming in 1991 – scoring twice.

|}

External links

1963 births
Living people
Footballers from Lisbon
Portuguese footballers
Association football defenders
Primeira Liga players
Liga Portugal 2 players
Clube Oriental de Lisboa players
Académico de Viseu F.C. players
AD Fafe players
F.C. Penafiel players
Boavista F.C. players
Vitória F.C. players
Portugal international footballers